The Bundeshandelsakademie in Braunau was built in 1930 and is the oldest education institute in the Innviertel, even one of the oldest of the whole Upper Austria. BHAK Braunau is a business school.

External links
 Homepage BHAK/BHAS Braunau

Business schools in Austria
Braunau am Inn
Education in Upper Austria